Ashton Youboty (born July 7, 1984) is a Liberian American football coach and former cornerback who is the current cornerbacks coach at Purdue. He played college football at Ohio State for coach Jim Tressel from 2003 to 2006 and played in the National Football League (NFL) for 6 season from 2006 to 2011. He forwent his senior season and was drafted by the Buffalo Bills in the third round (70 overall) of the 2006 NFL Draft. After five seasons with the Buffalo Bills (2006–2010), he played for the Jacksonville Jaguars in 2011.

Early years
Youboty was born in Monrovia, Liberia, the oldest of four children for Jeannet Waylee Youboty. After a civil war broke out in his native country, his family settled in Philadelphia, Pennsylvania, where he attended Girard College, a college-prep boarding school for single-parent kids and low-income families. Girard did not have a football team due to lack of insurance, so Youboty eventually joined the Wynnefield Hawks Football Club under the guidance of coach Wayne King.

Youboty and his family eventually relocated to Houston, Texas. He attended Klein High School, where he returned to graduate with the class of 2003 after participating as an early winter enrollee at the Ohio State University. As a freshman, he played football, basketball, and ran track. By the end of his freshman football season, he was moved up to the varsity football team, where he played cornerback, safety, wide receiver, and returned kicks. As a three-year starter, he competed against many of Houston's most talented football players including Woodlands High School's Danny Amendola. His first college-football scholarship offer came from Nick Saban during the latter's tenure at Louisiana State University but Youboty eventually signed to play for Jim Tressel at the Ohio State University.

College career
He passed up his senior year of eligibility at Ohio State University to enter the 2006 NFL Draft.

Professional career

Buffalo Bills
Youboty was drafted in the third round (70th overall) of the 2006 NFL Draft by the Buffalo Bills, joining Donte Whitner as the second Ohio State Buckeyes football player selected by the Bills in the draft. He played with the Bills for the first five seasons of his career from 2006 to 2010.  Youboty's best season in the NFL was 2007 when he appeared in eleven games for the Bills and was credited with 23 tackles (22 solo), a sack and an interception.

Jacksonville Jaguars
The Jacksonville Jaguars signed Youboty on November 15, 2011. In his first game, he recovered a fumble and returned it for a touchdown against the Houston Texans on November 27, 2011. Youboty was placed on Injured Reserve on December 26, 2011 after injuring his ACL. Youboty was released on August 25, 2012.

Coaching career
Following the conclusion of his athletic career, Youboty worked as a Quality control coach for the Wisconsin Badgers football program. After two seasons, he was elevated to senior defensive analyst.

For the 2020 and 2021 seasons, Youboty served as the cornerbacks coach for the Youngstown State Penguins football team.

In February 2022, Youboty joined Jeff Brohm's staff at Purdue as the cornerbacks coach.

Personal life
The oldest of four children, he has one sister and two brothers. His mother died in August 2006. He is the older brother of former Denver Broncos defensive end John Youboty.

References 

1984 births
Living people
Sportspeople from Monrovia
American people of Liberian descent
Players of American football from Philadelphia
Players of American football from Houston
Liberian players of American football
American football cornerbacks
Ohio State Buckeyes football players
Buffalo Bills players
Jacksonville Jaguars players
Klein High School alumni
Wisconsin Badgers football coaches
Youngstown State Penguins football coaches